Stephen Tiller (born 26 March 1987) is an Australian rules footballer for the Western Bulldogs of the AFL. The 54th overall pick in the 2004 AFL Draft, Tiller was recruited from the West Adelaide Football Club.

Stephen Tiller was born in the town of Wanilla, near Port Lincoln in South Australia. Previously attending Cummins High School, he also has two older brothers.

Following several years of development playing for the former Bulldogs VFL affiliate Werribee, Tiller was called up for his AFL debut against the West Coast Eagles in Round 17, 2007.
He was delisted by the Bulldogs on Wednesday 10 November 2010.

External links

Australian rules footballers from South Australia
Western Bulldogs players
West Adelaide Football Club players
Werribee Football Club players
1987 births
Living people